Ponders End Lock  (No 14) is a paired lock on the River Lee Navigation in England and is located near Ponders End, London. It is the last lock upstream that is large enough to take barges of up to 130 tons.

History 
The lock was fully mechanised and duplicated in 1959, and was the first major work in a £864.000 British Waterways project to improve the Navigation. Work was completed in twelve months.

Access to the lock
The lock is located in Wharf Road close to the crossing of the Lea Valley Road A110 and is near Ponders End railway station. Pedestrian and cycle access by the Lea Valley Walk

Recreation
Angling is allowed on the River Lee Navigation upstream and downstream of Ponders End Lock.

References

External links
The Lee Navigation
Ponders End lock- a history

Enfield, London
Locks of London
Geography of the London Borough of Enfield
Locks of the Lee Navigation